was a town located in Iyo District, Ehime Prefecture, Japan.

As of 2003, the town had an estimated population of 5,202 and a density of 83.67 persons per km². The total area was 62.17 km².

On April 1, 2005, Futami, along with the town of Nakayama (also from Iyo District), was merged into the expanded city of Iyo.

External links
  

Dissolved municipalities of Ehime Prefecture
Iyo, Ehime